In the mathematical study of order, a metric lattice  is a lattice that admits a positive valuation: a function  satisfying, for any ,  and

Relation to other notions

A Boolean algebra is a metric lattice; any finitely-additive measure on its Stone dual gives a valuation.

Every metric lattice is a modular lattice, c.f. lower picture. It is also a metric space, with distance function given by   With that metric, the join and meet are uniformly continuous contractions, and so extend to the metric completion (metric space).  That lattice is usually not the Dedekind-MacNeille completion, but it is conditionally complete.

Applications
In the study of fuzzy logic and interval arithmetic, the space of uniform distributions is a metric lattice.  Metric lattices are also key to von Neumann's construction of the continuous projective geometry.  A function satisfies the one-dimensional wave equation if and only if it is a valuation for the lattice of spacetime coordinates with the natural partial order.  A similar result should apply to any partial differential equation solvable by the method of characteristics, but key features of the theory are lacking.

References

Lattice theory
Metric spaces